Alcock Island is an island lying west of Charles Point in Hughes Bay, off the west coast of Graham Land. The name Penguin Island was used for the feature by whalers operating in the area in 1922. Since this name has not been used on published maps and is a duplication of an earlier name, it has been rejected and a new name substituted. Alcock Island is for Sir John W. Alcock (1892–1919), who, with Sir Arthur Whitten Brown, made the first nonstop trans-Atlantic flight on June 14–15, 1919.

See also 
 List of Antarctic and sub-Antarctic islands

References
 

Islands of Graham Land
Danco Coast